The Long River (Chinese: 龙江, pinyin: Lóng Jiāng, literally: Dragon River) is a river system in northern Guangxi Province, China.  It is a part of the larger Pearl River system by way of the Liu, Qian, Xun, and Xi Rivers.  Its true source is in Sandu Shui Autonomous County, Guizhou, where it is known as the Dagou He (Chinese: 打狗河).  It becomes the Jincheng Jiang (Chinese: 金城江) after entering Guangxi and passes through Hechi.  After joining with its left tributary, the Xiaohuan Jiang, it becomes known as the Long Jiang.  It then passes through Yizhou before meeting with the Rong Jiang to become the Liu.

The Long is famous for its natural scenery and scenes from the film, The Painted Veil, were filmed along its course.

References
Atlas of China, SinoMaps Press, 2007.

Rivers of Guangxi
Tributaries of the Pearl River (China)